Naim is a given name, Naim may also refer to:

Acronyms 
 Nucleotide Analog Interference Mapping, a molecular biology technique

Places 
 Arab al-Na'im, a Bedouin village in northern Israel
 Bani Na'im, a Palestinian-Arab town in the Judea
 Dar-Naim, Mauritania
 Dhi Na'im District, in Al Bayda' Governorate, Yemen
 Kota Darul Naim, State secretariat building in Malaysia
 Mexico City Texcoco Airport, NAIM or NAICM, a partially-built airport cancelled in 2019
 Nain, Naim, a village mentioned in New Testament
 Al Nuaim, a bedouin tribe in the Arab states of the Persian Gulf
 Noaim, a neighbourhood in Manama, capital of Bahrain
 Qalai Naeem, village in eastern Afghanistan

Other uses 
 Naim (chat program), a messaging and chat software
 Naim Audio, a UK manufacturer of audio and hifi equipment